The Shark River Slough Archeological District is a historic district within the Everglades National Park in Miami-Dade County, Florida, United States, west of Homestead, that is listed on the National Register of Historic Places.

Description
In order to protect the archeological sites, the actual location (address) of the district is restricted.

The district was added to the National Register of Historic Places November 5, 1996.

See also

 National Register of Historic Places listings in Miami-Dade County, Florida
 Archeological Resources of Everglades National Park MPS

References

External links

 Dade County listings at National Register of Historic Places

Archaeological sites in Florida
Geography of Miami-Dade County, Florida
National Register of Historic Places in Miami-Dade County, Florida
Historic districts on the National Register of Historic Places in Florida
National Register of Historic Places in Everglades National Park
1996 establishments in Florida